Main (also Romanized as Mā’īn; also known as Mahīān, Māhīn, Mā’īnī, and Qal‘eh Now-e Mā’īn) is a village in Abarj Rural District, Dorudzan District, Marvdasht County, Fars Province, Iran. At the 2006 census, it's population was 765, in 148 families.

References 

Populated places in Marvdasht County